The Bud Shank Quartet is an album by Bud Shank recorded in January 1956 for the Pacific Jazz label.

Track listing
 "Bag of Blues" (Bob Cooper) - 6:47
 "Nature Boy" (eden ahbez) - 4:25
 "All This and Heaven Too" (Block-Davis, Miller) - 4:50
 "Jubilation" (Cooper) - 5:43
 "Do Nothing till You Hear from Me" (Duke Ellington, Bob Russell) - 5:34
 "Nocturne for Flute" (Claude Williamson) - 2:45
 "Walkin'" (Richard Carpenter) - 9:35
 "Carioca" (Vincent Youmans, Edward Eliscu and Gus Kahn) - 4:54

Personnel 
Bud Shank - alto saxophone, flute
Claude Williamson - piano
Don Prell - bass
Chuck Flores - drums

References 

1957 albums
Bud Shank albums
Pacific Jazz Records albums